This is a list of the major natural gas pipelines operating within Western Australia.

Onshore pipelines

Subsea (offshore) pipelines

See also
Petroleum in Western Australia
North West Shelf
List of natural gas pipelines in Queensland
List of natural gas pipelines in New South Wales

References and notes

Further reading
 (2007) The Petroleum Explorers Guide to Western Australia. Third Edition Department of Industry and Resources of Western Australia  (PDF)

External links
 https://web.archive.org/web/20080511200417/http://www.doir.wa.gov.au/

Pipelines
Western Australia
Natural gas pipelines
Natural gas pipelines
Natural gas pipelines, Western Australia
Natural gas pipelines, Western Australia